Sanjay Balraj Dutt (born 29 July 1959) is a popular Indian film actor and producer known for his work in Hindi cinema (Bollywood). The son of veteran Hindi film actors Sunil Dutt and Nargis Dutt, he made his acting debut in Rocky (1981) and has since appeared in more than 187 Hindi films. Although Dutt has been a lead actor in genres ranging from romance to comedy, he has been most popular in the roles of gangsters, thugs and police officers in the drama and action genres. The Indian media and audiences alike refer to him as Deadly Dutt for his portrayals of such characters.
 
In a film career spanning more than 37 years, Dutt has won two Filmfare Awards, two IIFA Awards, two Bollywood Movie Awards, three Screen Awards, three Stardust Awards, two Zee Cine Awards, and a Global Indian Film Award. Four of his films have won various National Film Awards. He has won most of his awards for Vaastav: The Reality, Mission Kashmir, Munna Bhai M.B.B.S., and Lage Raho Munna Bhai. He won three Best Actor awards for Vaastav: The Reality.

Filmfare Awards
 1992: Nominated, Best Actor for Saajan
 1994: Nominated, Best Actor for Khalnayak
 2000: Won, Best Actor for Vaastav: The Reality
 2001: Nominated, Best Actor for Mission Kashmir
 2003: Nominated, Best Supporting Actor for Kaante
 2004: Won, Best Comedian for Munnabhai M.B.B.S.
 2006: Nominated, Best Supporting Actor for Parineeta
 2007: Nominated, Best Actor for Lage Raho Munna Bhai

Star Screen Awards
 2000: Won, Best Actor for Vaastav: The Reality
 2001: Nominated, Best Actor for Kurukshetra
 2001: Won, Best Supporting Actor for Mission Kashmir
 2004: Nominated, Best Actor for Munnabhai M.B.B.S.
 2005: Nominated, Best Supporting Actor for Musafir
 2013: Nominated, Best Villain for Agneepath

International Indian Film Academy Awards
 2000: Won, Best Actor for Vaastav: The Reality
 2001: Nominated, Best Actor for Mission Kashmir
 2007: Nominated, Best Actor for Lage Raho Munna Bhai 
 2010: Won, Best Performance in a Comic Role for All the Best
 2013: Nominated, Best Actor in a Negative Role for Agneepath

Global Indian Film Awards
 2006: Won, Best Actor (Male) - Critics for Lage Raho Munna Bhai

Stardust Awards
 2004: Won, Star of the Year Award - Male for Munnabhai M.B.B.S.
 2007: Won, Star of the Year Award - Male for Lage Raho Munna Bhai
 2013: Won, Best Actor in a Negative Role for Agneepath

Zee Cine Awards
 2001:  Won, Zee Premiere Choice - Male for Mission Kashmir
 2007:  Won, Best Actor (Male) - Critics for Lage Raho Munna Bhai

Bollywood Movie Awards
 2003: Won, Best Actor (Male) - Critics for Kaante
 2004: Won, Most Sensational Actor for Munnabhai M.B.B.S.

Bengal Film Journalists' Association Awards
 2004: Won, Best Actor for Munnabhai M.B.B.S.

Other awards
 2004: Won, Celebrity Style Male at the Bollywood Fashion Awards
2008: Won: AXN Best Action Actor – Sanjay Dutt
 2014: Nominated, Bollywood Hungama Surfers' Choice Movie Award for Best Supporting Actor - PK

See also
 List of accolades received by Lage Raho Munna Bhai

References

Dutt, Sanjay, list of awards and nominations received by
Sanjay Dutt